Charles Patrick Fleeming Jenkin, Baron Jenkin of Roding,  (7 September 1926 – 20 December 2016) was a British Conservative Party politician who served as a cabinet minister in Margaret Thatcher's first government.

Life and career
Jenkin was born in September 1926 and educated at the Dragon School in Oxford, Clifton College in Bristol and Jesus College, Cambridge. He became a barrister, called by the Middle Temple in 1952, and company director. He was a councillor on Hornsey Borough Council from 1960 to 1963.

The following year, Jenkin became the Conservative Member of Parliament for Wanstead and Woodford. From 1965, he served as an Opposition spokesman on economic and trade affairs. He was a member of the Bow Group from 1951. In January 1974, he became Minister for Energy just weeks before the Conservatives fell from office, and participated in many ways in the government of Margaret Thatcher. He served as Secretary of State for Social Services from 1979 to 1981, then as Secretary of State for Industry until 1983, and finally as Secretary of State for the Environment from 1983 to 1985.

Jenkin retired from the Commons at the 1987 general election. He was elevated to the House of Lords as a life peer with the title Baron Jenkin of Roding, of Wanstead and Woodford in Greater London. Whilst in the Lords, Jenkin was interviewed in 2012 as part of The History of Parliament's oral history project. He was noted for his contribution to the debate during the passage of the Marriage (Same Sex Couples) Act 2013. On 6 January 2015 he retired from the House of Lords pursuant to section 1 of the House of Lords Reform Act 2014. He died on 20 December 2016, aged 90.

Jenkin was president of the Foundation for Science and Technology, and a vice-president of the Local Government Association.

Family and personal life
Lord Jenkin's grandfather, Frewen, was the first Professor of Engineering Science at the University of Oxford from 1908 in the newly created Department of Engineering Science, and the namesake of the Jenkin Building at Oxford. Lord Jenkin's great-grandfather was the engineer Fleeming Jenkin.

In 1958, he married (Alison) Monica Graham (1928–2022). They had two sons and two daughters. Their younger son, Bernard, is the Conservative Member of Parliament for Harwich and North Essex.

Arms

References

External links
 
The Papers of Lord Jenkin of Roding held at Churchill Archives Centre

|-

|-

|-

|-

|-

1926 births
2016 deaths
Alumni of Jesus College, Cambridge
British Secretaries of State
British Secretaries of State for the Environment
Conservative Party (UK) MPs for English constituencies
Conservative Party (UK) life peers
Councillors in Greater London
Members of the Bow Group
Members of the Privy Council of the United Kingdom
People educated at Clifton College
People educated at The Dragon School
UK MPs 1964–1966
UK MPs 1966–1970
UK MPs 1970–1974
UK MPs 1974
UK MPs 1974–1979
UK MPs 1979–1983
UK MPs 1983–1987
Secretaries of State for Health and Social Services
Chief Secretaries to the Treasury
Life peers created by Elizabeth II